Xylomya tenthredinoides is a species of fly in the family Xylomyidae.

Distribution
Canada, United States.

References

Xylomyidae
Insects described in 1867
Taxa named by Frederik Maurits van der Wulp
Diptera of North America